Marie-Georges Pascal (born Marie-Georges Charlotte Faisy; October 2, 1946 – November 9, 1985) was a French film, television and theatre actress.

Early life
Marie-Georges Pascal was born in Cambrai in northern France. She later described her childhood as "very hard" and " very sad". Her parents, who dreamed of seeing her becoming a concert artist, forced her to spend her days playing the piano. At the age of sixteen, after the death of her mother and her father's remarriage, she left home and got a job as a model.

On screen
She made her debut in 1971, appearing in Jean-Claude Roy's French classic Les Petites Filles modèles, in which she played one of the lead roles alongside Jessica Dorn, Cathy Reghin, Michele Girardon and Bella Darvi.

From 1972 to early 1973 she performed six erotic films including Je suis frigide... pourquoi? with Sandra Julien, German film Hausfrauen Report international, Bananes mécaniques, with Anne Libert, Pauline Larrieu, Philippe Gasté and Patrice Valota, Quand Les Filles se Déchaînent, Les Infidèles and Les confidences érotiques d'un lit trop accueillant, with Olga Georges-Picot.

In 1973, she received roles in comedy films, L'Historie Très Bonne et Très Joyeuse de Colinot Trousse-Chemise, with Brigitte Bardot and Gross Paris, and in a drama La Rage au poing, alongside Tony Gatlif.

In 1974, she received the leading role in Le Dessous du ciel, playing a young woman passionate for parachuting. Mixing adventure and romance, the series was a success and substantially increased her popularity in France. The series is well received in countries such as Germany, thanks to Pierre Brice's presence in the cast. Her next television credits include leading roles in drama series, Les Pilotes de courses, La Vie des autres and a part in an episode of the long-running crime series Les Cinq Dernières Minutes. Pascal has also starred in television films and mini-series like D'Artagnan Amoureux.

In other countries such as the United States and United Kingdom, she is best known for playing the lead role as Élisabeth in the 1978 Jean Rollin classic horror Les Raisins de la Mort, in which Rollin himself said she was very "moving" and that "she made her character's descent into madness is extremely real". The same year, she also appeared in Brigade Mondaine, an adaptation of a novel edited by Gérard de Villiers with a soundtrack by Marc Cerrone. During the 1980s she appeared in two films, Cauchemar and Flics de choc with Mylène Demongeot, which was her final film.

On stage
Robert Hossein gave her the opportunity to make her debut on stage in 1970 in an adaptation of Georges Simenon's novel La Neige était sale. In 1972, she showed off various skills in the musical Madame Pauline. Then she played both in comedies and dramas.

She played in Marc Camoletti's success of Boulevard theatre Duos sur canapé (1974) and Boeing-Boeing (1976), Eugène Labiche's classical Vaudeville The Italian Straw Hat (1980), Molière's Les Femmes Savantes (1979) and Jean Anouilh's Le Nombril (1983).

She also played dramatic characters like Chimène in Corneille's Le Cid (1975), Ismene in Anouilh's Antigone (1975-1976), Jeanie in Henry Miller's Just wild about Harry (1977), Estelle Rigault in Jean-Paul Sartre's No Exit (1982) and Germaine Lechat in Octave Mirbeau's Business is business (1985).

Death
Marie-Georges Pascal died in Paris at the age of 39. The apparent cause of her death was suicide.

Filmography

Film

Television

Archive footage
 1975: Rêves pornos / Le Dictionnaire de l'érotisme, directed by Max Pécas (edited from Je Suis Frigide...Pourquoi?) ... Carla
 1999: Eurotika !, documentary television series directed by Andy Stark and Pete Tombs  : Episodes: Vampires and Virgins: The Films of Jean Rollin (edited from Les Raisins de la Mort), Is there a Doctor in the House: Medicine gone bad (edited from Je Suis Frigide...Pourquoi?), I am a Nymphomaniac: Erotic Films of Max Pécas (edited from Je Suis Frigide...Pourquoi?)
 2007: La Nuit des horloges, directed by Jean Rollin  (edited from Les Raisins de la Mort) .. Élisabeth
 2007: Secret Cinema (Das geheime Kino), short directed by Michael Wolf (edited from Les Raisins de la mort)
 2008: Spark of Life, short directed by Mike Bazanele (edited from Les Raisins de la mort)
 2008: Grindhouse Universe, (trailer of Les Petites Filles modèles)
 2011: Jean Rollin, le rêveur égaré, documentary directed by Damien Dupont and Yvan Pierre-Kaiser (edited from Les Raisins de la mort)
 2015: Jean Rollin, être et à voir, documentary directed by Jean-Loup Martin (edited from Les Raisins de la mort)

Theatre
 1970 : La Neige était sale (Frédéric Dard and Georges Simenon, directed by Robert Hossein) ... Minna
 1972 : La Maison de Zaza (musical by Darry Cowl from Gaby Bruyère's play) ... Fleur-de-Pêcher
 1974 : Duos sur canapé (Marc Camoletti, directed by Marc Camoletti) ... Bubble
 1975 : Le Cid (Pierre Corneille, directed by Michel Le Royer) ... Chimène
 1975 : Antigone (Jean Anouilh, directed by Nicole Anouilh) ... Ismene
 1976 : Boeing-Boeing (Marc Camoletti, directed by Christian-Gérard) ... Judith
 1977 : Just wild about Harry (Henry Miller, directed by François Joxe) ... Jeanie
 1978 : Boeing-Boeing (Marc Camoletti, directed by Christian-Gérard) ... Judith
 1979 : Les Femmes Savantes (Molière, directed by Jean Térensier) ...
 1979 : Boeing-Boeing (Marc Camoletti, directed by Christian-Gérard) ... Judith
 1980 : Duos sur canapé (Marc Camoletti, directed by Marc Camoletti) ... Bubble
 1980 : Soir de grève (Odile Ehret, directed by Virgil Tanase) ... the woman
 1981 : The Italian Straw Hat (Eugène Marin Labiche and Marc-Michel, directed by Guy Kayat) ... Hélène
 1982 : No Exit (Jean-Paul Sartre, directed by Georges Wilson) ... Estelle Rigault
 1983 : Le Nombril (Jean Anouilh, directed by Jean Anouilh and Roland Piétri) ... Joséphine
 1985 : Business is business (Octave Mirbeau, directed by Pierre Dux) ... Germaine Lechat

References

External links
 

1946 births
1985 deaths
French film actresses
French television actresses
French stage actresses
20th-century French actresses
People from Cambrai
1985 suicides
Suicides in France